Macrogastra is a genus of air-breathing land snails, terrestrial pulmonate gastropod mollusks in the subfamily Clausiliinae  of the family Clausiliidae, the door snails. 

Like all clausiliids, the shells of the species in this genus are sinistral, or left-handed in their coiling.

Species
Species in this genus include:

 Macrogastra asphaltina (Rossmässler, 1836)
 Macrogastra attenuata (Rossmässler, 1835) 	 
 Macrogastra badia (Pfeiffer, 1828)		 
 Macrogastra borealis (Boettger, 1878)		 
 Macrogastra densestriata (Rossmässler, 1836)	 
 † Macrogastra loryi (Michaud, 1862) 
 Macrogastra mellae (Stabile, 1864)	
 † Macrogastra multistriata H. Nordsieck, 1981	 
 Macrogastra plicatula (Draparnaud, 1801)		 
 Macrogastra portensis (Luso da Silva, 1872) 
 † Macrogastra reischuetzi H. Nordsieck, 2014 	 
 Macrogastra rolphii (Turton, 1826)	
 † Macrogastra schlickumi (H. Nordsieck, 1972)
 † Macrogastra sessenheimensis (H. Nordsieck, 1974)	 
 Macrogastra tumida (Rossmässler, 1836)		 
 Macrogastra ventricosa (Draparnaud, 1801) - type species
 † Macrogastra vindobonensis (Papp & Thenius, 1954) 
 † Macrogastra voesendorfensis (Papp & Thenius, 1954)

References

 Luso da Silva, A. 1872. Molluscos [sic] terrestres e fluviaes de Portugal. (Continuação). - Jornal de Sciencias Mathematicas Physicas e Naturaes 3: 257-261. Lisboa.
 Nordsieck, H. (1977). Zur Anatomie und Systematik der Clausilien, XVIII. Neue Taxa rezenter Clausilien. Archiv für Molluskenkunde, 108 (1/3): 73‑107. Frankfurt am Main
 Bank, R. A. (2017). Classification of the Recent terrestrial Gastropoda of the World. Last update: July 16th, 2017

External links
 Hartmann, J.D.W. (1840-1844). Erd- und Süsswasser-Gasteropoden der Schweiz. Mit Zugabe einiger merkwürdigen exotischen Arten, i-xx, 1-36, pl. 1-2 [30-06-1840; 37-116, pl. 13-36 [1841]; 117-156, pl. 37-60 [1842]; 157-204, pl. 61-72 [1843]; 205-227, pl. 73-84 [1844]. St. Gallen.]

Clausiliidae
Gastropod genera